Eucereon guacolda is a moth of the subfamily Arctiinae. It was described by Poey in 1832. It is found on Cuba.

References

guacolda
Moths described in 1832
Endemic fauna of Cuba